Fianarantsoa Airport  is an airport in Fianarantsoa, Madagascar.

Airlines and destinations

References

Airport
Airports in Madagascar
Fianarantsoa Province